Aldra Kauwa Wilson (born June 21, 1977) is a former American college and professional football player who was a linebacker in the National Football League (NFL) for eight seasons.  He played college football for the University of Tennessee, and was recognized as a consensus All-American.  Wilson was drafted by the Denver Broncos in the first round of the 1999 NFL Draft, and played his entire professional career for the Broncos.  He was a five-time Pro Bowl selection and a two-time All-Pro selection.

Early years
Wilson was born in Jackson, Tennessee.  He was an All-American performer at Jackson Central-Merry High School in Jackson, as named by BlueChip Illustrated, Max Emfinger, SuperPrep, and recruiting analyst Tom Lemming. In addition, he was named to the Tennessee all-state team.  Wilson was both a linebacker and running back at Jackson Central-Merry, rushing for 1,160 yards and 15 touchdowns in his senior season. He rushed for over 1,000 yards in three seasons in high school, two as a running back and one as a quarterback. In addition to football, he starred in track and basketball.

College career
Wilson attended the University of Tennessee, and played for coach Phillip Fulmer's Tennessee Volunteers football team from 1995 to 1998.  He was a team captain on the 1998 Tennessee team that won the National Championship in the Fiesta Bowl over Florida State and back-to-back Southeastern Conference (SEC) championships in the 1997 and 1998 seasons. Wilson was recognized as a consensus first-team All-American in 1998 after being a three-year starter for the Volunteers. Wilson was known for his leadership. For his efforts on the field, on December 7, 2021, Wilson was inducted into the National Football Foundation's College Football Hall of Fame.

Professional career

Wilson was drafted after his final year at Tennessee as the 31st pick in the first round  of the 1999 NFL Draft and signed to the Denver Broncos due to the assistance of super agent Tank Black.

Denver Broncos

Over the course of his professional career, Wilson was the anchor of the Broncos' defense. Wilson made his NFL debut against the Miami Dolphins in the Broncos' 1999 season opener. He recorded his first sack in Week 5 against the Oakland Raiders. He finished the 1999 season with 77 total tackles, four passes defended, and two forced fumbles. In his second season, he had five sacks, 61 total tackles, three interceptions, and eight passes defended in 15 games of the 2000 season.

Wilson had three sacks, 85 total tackles, and five passes defended in the 2001 season. He earned his first Pro Bowl nomination. In the 2002 season, Wilson had five sacks, 132 total tackles (100 solo), four passes defended, one forced fumble, and two fumble recoveries. He led the team in tackles and earned his second Pro Bowl nomination. In the 2003 season, Wilson led the Broncos in tackles for the second consecutive year with 88. He earned his third consecutive Pro Bowl nomination for his performance in the 2003 season. In Week 11 of the 2004 season, against the New Orleans Saints, Wilson had a seven-yard pick six for his first NFL touchdown. In the 2004 season, Wilson had 2.5 sacks, 105 total tackles, two interceptions, five passes defended, and two forced fumbles. Wilson earned a fourth Pro Bowl nomination for his 2005 season, where he had three sacks, 73 total tackles, nine passes defended, two forced fumbles, and one fumble recovery. He earned AFC Defensive Player of the Week for Week 4 against the Jacksonville Jaguars, where he had two forced fumbles. He was named as a first team All-Pro for 2005.

On December 3, 2006, Wilson suffered a neck injury during a fake field goal attempt against the Seattle Seahawks during the Sunday Night Football game. He was carted off the field and immediately taken to a hospital, but was cleared by the Denver Broncos to return the following week to help Denver try to make the playoffs. Wilson led the team in tackles with 102 in the 2006 season. He earned his fifth Pro Bowl nomination.

The Denver Broncos signed many free agents during the 2007 offseason, such as running back Travis Henry and quarterback Patrick Ramsey, resulting in some salary cap trouble. The Broncos attempted to trade Wilson to the New York Giants, but Wilson failed his physical and the trade talks died down.

Wilson was released by the Denver Broncos on April 13, 2007, due to injuries and salary cap problems.

Free agency and retirement
Wilson was cleared to return to resume playing by Los Angeles back specialist Bob Watkins in January 2008. On February 12, he had his first visit of the offseason with the Detroit Lions. He also visited the Cleveland Browns in March, but he rejected their offer for close to the veteran minimum.

Wilson officially announced his retirement from professional football on September 10, 2008.

NFL statistics

Regular season

Postseason

Personal life
After his career with the Denver Broncos ended, Wilson started a career as a Colorado football executive. Wilson became the co-owner of Project FANchise, which puts fans in control of professional teams. In addition, he acquired the Indoor Football League’s Colorado Crush.

References

External links

 Tennessee Volunteers bio

1977 births
Living people
All-American college football players
American Conference Pro Bowl players
American football linebackers
Denver Broncos players
People from Jackson, Tennessee
Players of American football from Tennessee
Tennessee Volunteers football players